Coonardoo: The Well in the Shadow is a novel written by the Australian author Katharine Susannah Prichard. The novel evocatively depicts the Australian landscape as it was in the late 1920s, in an age when white settlers tried to control more and more of the bare plains of northwest Australia.

Originally submitted to The Bulletin novel competition in 1928 under the pseudonym Ashburton Jim, this novel was joint winner.  It shared the award with A House is Built by M. Barnard Eldershaw.

It was first serialised in The Bulletin magazine in 15 weekly instalments from 5 September 1928.

Plot
The novel relates the story of an Aboriginal woman who was prepared since her childhood to be Wytaliba station's housekeeper, but falls in love and has a romance with her owner Hugh Watt, a white man.

External links
 Banned books in Australia

References

1928 Australian novels
Novels first published in serial form
Works originally published in The Bulletin (Australian periodical)
Novels set in Western Australia
Jonathan Cape books
Katharine Susannah Prichard